The 28th Primetime Emmy Awards were handed out on May 17, 1976. The ceremony was hosted by John Denver and Mary Tyler Moore. Winners are listed in bold with series' networks in parentheses. As of 2019, this was the last Emmy Awards ceremonies held during the first half of a calendar year.

The top show of the night was Mary Tyler Moore which won its second straight Outstanding Comedy Series award, and five major awards overall. Police Story, won Outstanding Drama Series, even though it only received one major nomination.

The television miniseries Rich Man, Poor Man set numerous records. It received 17 major nominations, breaking the record held by Playhouse 90 which was set in 1959 (since broken). It also received 13 acting nominations, although some of the acting categories at this ceremony were later eliminated or combined. Despite this, it lost Outstanding Limited Series to Upstairs, Downstairs.

The Shubert Theatre had previously hosted the 1973 Emmy ceremony; it would host the ceremony a third and final time in 2001.

Winners and nominees

Programs

Acting

Lead performances

Supporting performances

Single performances

Directing

Writing

Most major nominations
By network 
 CBS – 57
 ABC – 49
 NBC – 28
 PBS – 16

 By program
 Rich Man, Poor Man (ABC) – 10
 Mary Tyler Moore (CBS) /  M*A*S*H (CBS) – 9
 Eleanor and Franklin (CBS) – 8
 Upstairs, Downstairs (PBS) – 6
 The Adams Chronicles (PBS) / Barney Miller (ABC) / Fear on Trial (CBS) / A Moon for the Misbegotten (ABC) – 5

Most major awards
By network 
 CBS – 12
 ABC – 10
 NBC – 8
 PBS – 5

 By program
 Mary Tyler Moore (CBS) – 5
 Eleanor and Franklin (CBS) – 4
 NBC's Saturday Night (NBC) / Rich Man, Poor Man (ABC) – 3

Notes

References

External links
 Emmys.com list of 1976 Nominees & Winners
 

028
Primetime Emmy Awards
1976 in California
May 1976 events in the United States